Born to Love You may refer to:
"Born to Love You" (Mark Collie song), by Mark Collie, 1993
"Born to Love You" (Lanco song), by Lanco, 2018
Born to Love You (film), a 2012 Filipino romantic film